Acupalpus dubius is an insect-eating ground beetle of the Acupalpus genus.

References

dubius
Beetles described in 1888